The Rolling Stones had four concert tours in 1966. Ike & Tina Turner supported them on the UK leg in the fall. "I didn't know who the Stones were," Tina recalled. "They were just these white boys and Mick was the one who was always standing in the wings watching us. He was a little shy of me, but finally we started having fun and I tried to teach him some dances, because he'd just stand still onstage with the tambourine. He'd try things like the Pony or some hip movements backstage and we'd all just laugh." Turner reappeared with the Stones on their 1981 tour. In Rolling Stones released the Album "After Math".

Band
Mick Jagger – lead vocals, harmonica, tambourine
Keith Richards – guitar, backing vocals
Brian Jones – guitar, organ, electric dulcimer, harmonica, backing vocals
Bill Wyman – bass guitar, backing vocals
Charlie Watts – drums

Australian tour

The tour of Australia and New Zealand commenced on 18 February and concluded on 1 March 1966.

Australian tour dates

European tour

The European tour commenced on 26 March and concluded on 5 April 1966.

European tour dates

American tour

The American tour commenced on 24 June and concluded on 28 July 1966, and supported their album Aftermath. The last gig – in Honolulu, Hawaii – was broadcast on Hawaiian radio's K-POI.

American tour dates

Hawaii set list
Intro / Not Fade Away
The Last Time
Paint It Black
Lady Jane
Mother's Little Helper
Get Off of My Cloud
19th Nervous Breakdown
(I Can't Get No) Satisfaction

British tour

The British tour commenced on 23 September and concluded on 9 October 1966.

British tour dates

References
2.Rolling stones tour 2019 USA: Mick Jagger back on stage after health issues

 Carr, Roy. The Rolling Stones: An Illustrated Record. Harmony Books, 1976. 

The Rolling Stones concert tours
1966 concert tours